Silvana Totolo (born 14 October 1986) is a team handball player from Argentina. She defends Argentina, such as at the 2011 World Women's Handball Championship in Brazil.

References

1986 births
Living people
Argentine female handball players
Handball players at the 2011 Pan American Games
Handball players at the 2007 Pan American Games
Pan American Games medalists in handball
Pan American Games bronze medalists for Argentina
Medalists at the 2007 Pan American Games
Medalists at the 2011 Pan American Games
21st-century Argentine women